Veruela Abbey (or "The Royal Monastery of Santa María de Veruela") is a Cistercian abbey dating from the 12th century.  It is situated near Vera de Moncayo, in Zaragoza province, Spain.  It was founded in 1146 by Pedro de Atarés.

History

The monastery and church, forming one edifice, were founded in 1146 by Pedro de Atarés, to whom the Blessed Virgin appeared, and whom She directed to discover a hidden statue of herself, which was placed in the monastery chapel, where it is still venerated.

Pedro de Atarés did not live to see the completion of the buildings, whose construction took more than twenty years, but before his death he was enrolled among the Cistercians, who were dwelling in the partly finished abbey.

The most famous abbots of Veruela were Hernando de Aragón (1498–1577) and Lope Marco (died 1560). He was succeeded by Lope Marco who, as his epitaph tells us, raised the monastery "ex terreo marmoreum, ex augusto amplum".

The chapter house at the southern side of the cloister (an exact representation of the Westminster Abbey cloister) is Byzantine. The great buildings, including church, monastery, house, and cloister, constructed at different times and in different styles, are surrounded by a wall that dates back to feudal times.

Antonio José Rodríguez, styled by Menéndez y Pelayo as "one of the most remarkable cultivators of medical moral studies" (Ciencia espanola, III, 440), lived at Veruela and died within its walls in 1777. Gustavo Becquer, the Spanish poet, made Veruela his abode while the religious were prevented from living there.

From 1835 to 1877 the buildings were in the hands of secular clergy. From that date they were occupied by  Jesuits. Assisted by the duchess of Villahermosa, they restored the church and monastery. Of the Jesuits who lived at Veruela, Padre Costa was theologian to the First Vatican Council; Lluís Ignasi Fiter revived the "Congregaciones Marianas" in Spain; Antonio Rota, later secretary of the Society of Jesus, was the rector of Veruela when in 1888 the image of the Blessed Virgin was solemnly crowned.

See also
 List of Bienes de Interés Cultural in the Province of Zaragoza
 List of Jesuit sites

References
 The entry cites:
The apparition is attested by ABARCA, ZURITA, and ARGENSOLA in their Anales de Aragón. 
PIFERRER, Noviliario de los reinos y senorios de España, IV; 
YEPES, Cronica de San Benito, VII (Valladolid, 1621), 370;
DE ZARAGOZA, Teatro hist. de las iglesias del reino de Aragón, IV, 74;
Definitiones congregationis cisterciensis coronae Aragónum (Valladolid, 1790); 
DE UZTARROZ, Cronologia de las imagenes aparecidas de N. Senora en Aragón (Saragossa, 1644); 
TORRE, Resena hist. de N. S. de Veruela (Barcelona, 1881);
NONELL, La santa duquesa (Madrid, 1892); 
José María Quadrado, Aragón in España, sus monumentos y artes (Barcelona, 1886)
"Note: there is at present in the archives of Veruela an extensive collection of documents gathered by FITER who began to write a complete history of Veruela. There is also a MS. Brevis hist. regalis monasterii Berolae, ab ejus fundatione quae fuit anno 1146 usque ad annum 1738."

Monasteries in Aragon
Buildings and structures in the Province of Zaragoza
Cistercian monasteries in the Crown of Aragon
Cistercian monasteries in Spain
Bien de Interés Cultural landmarks in the Province of Zaragoza
Romanesque architecture in Aragon
Organisations based in Spain with royal patronage